Jeffrey Checkes (born May 30, 1943) is an American fencer. He competed in the individual and team foil events at the 1968 Summer Olympics.

References

External links
 

1943 births
Living people
American male foil fencers
Olympic fencers of the United States
Fencers at the 1968 Summer Olympics
Sportspeople from Brooklyn
Pan American Games medalists in fencing
Pan American Games silver medalists for the United States
Fencers at the 1967 Pan American Games